is a subway station in Chūō-ku, Sapporo, Hokkaido, Japan, operated by Sapporo Municipal Subway. The station opened on 16 December 1971 as part of the first phase of the Namboku Line.

Lines
Odori Station is served by all lines of the Sapporo Municipal Subway.

Platforms

Station layout

Namboku Line

Tōzai Line

Tōhō Line

Surrounding area
 Ōdōri Park
 4th Ave (Sapporoeki-mae Avenue)
 Mitsukoshi
 Central business district
 Sapporo Citizens Hall
 Doshin Hall
 NHK Sapporo
 Sapporo TV Tower
 Sapporo Clock Tower
 Former Hokkaidō government office building
 Sapporo streetcar Nishi 4-Chome Station
 Hokkaido Police Headquarters
 Hokkaido University Botanical Gardens
 Tanukikoji shopping arcade
 Theater Kino
 Nijo fish market
 Hokkaido Chuo Bus Sapporo Terminal
 Odori bus Center Building
 Sapporo Grand Hotel

See also
 List of railway stations in Japan

References

External links

 Sapporo Subway Stations

Railway stations in Japan opened in 1971
Railway stations in Sapporo
Sapporo Municipal Subway
Chūō-ku, Sapporo